Edward Penn (3 January 1923 – 1968) was a Kenyan sports shooter. He competed in the 50 metre pistol event at the 1960 Summer Olympics.

References

External links
 

1923 births
1968 deaths
Kenyan male sport shooters
Olympic shooters of Kenya
Shooters at the 1960 Summer Olympics
Place of birth missing